The Hudson's Bay Company, at one time a fur trading business, has operated a large fleet of vessels in its history.

Ship list

References

Lists of ships of Canada
Lists of sailing ships
Hudson's Bay Company ships